Pozm-e Machchan (also Romanized as Pozm-e Machchān; also known as Māchān, Māchā Pozm, Māshān, and Pozm Machā) is a village in Jahliyan Rural District, in the Central District of Konarak County, Sistan and Baluchestan Province, Iran. At the 2006 census, its population was 642, in 82 families.

References 

Populated places in Konarak County